Modoc is an unincorporated community in Scott County, Kansas, United States.

History
A post office was opened in Modoc (formerly called Plummer) in 1886, and remained in operation until it was discontinued in 1992.  Also, the community was formerly called Isabel too.

References

Further reading

External links
 Scott County maps: Current, Historic, KDOT

Unincorporated communities in Scott County, Kansas
Unincorporated communities in Kansas